Imaginary Force is the second solo album by Greek keyboardist and guitarist Bob Katsionis. It was released June 6, 2004, under the label Lion Music. Katsionis is currently in the band Firewind.

Track listing
 "The Imaginary Force" – 4:11
 "March Of The Spirits" – 3:58
 "Sing For The Day" – 4:39
 "Galaxy" – 3:06
 "Sudden Death" – 3:13
 "Bird's Eye View – 3:31
 "Is It Me Or The Weather?" – 4:18
 "All My Naked Hopes" – 4:08
 "Separated" – 4:46
 "St. Pervert" – 3:58
 "Tsifteteli (Overture 1821)" 5:56
 "Ouzo!" – 6:23

Personnel

Band members
Bob Katsionis – Guitars and keyboards
Stavros Giannakopoulos – Bass
Fotis Giannakopoulos – Drums

Guest musicians
 Theodore Ziras – Guitar solo on "Ouzo!"
 Alex Flouros – Guitar solo on "Ouzo!"

References

2004 albums